The  opened in Ando, Nara Prefecture, Japan in 1974. It is dedicated to the life and works of Tomimoto Kenkichi,  who was born in the vicinity.

References

Further reading

External links

 Tomimoto Kenkichi Memorial Museum
 http://www.e-yakimono.net/html/tomimoto-kenkichi-04-jt.html

Museums in Nara Prefecture
Folk art museums and galleries in Japan
Biographical museums in Japan
Art museums established in 1974
1974 establishments in Japan